Jari Mäenpää (born 23 December 1977) is a Finnish heavy metal multi-instrumentalist and songwriter. He is the founder of Wintersun for which he records all instruments except the drums. Before forming Wintersun, Mäenpää was best known for his role in the folk metal band Ensiferum, which he joined in 1996 after leaving his prior band named Immemorial. Wintersun was initially planned as a parallel project alongside Ensiferum, but in January, 2004 he was forced to leave Ensiferum due to clashes between their touring schedule and the studio recording time he had booked for Wintersun.

In 1997, Mäenpää had to put his musical career on hold to take part in Finland's compulsory military service. In an interview, Mäenpää admitted he disliked the time he spent in the military and suspects it's where he acquired tuberculosis.

Jari was also a member of the band Arthemesia, and participated in Kimmo Miettinen's side project Lost Alone.

Writing style 
 
Jari's style of guitar playing utilizes tremolo-picked melodies and phrases and the heavy use of extremely fast sweep-picking solos and breaks as heard on most of the songs.  The speed of Wintersun's music is due in part to the use of blast beats and quick, spacey keyboard lines. This gives the guitar a charging, power metal feel for the most part.

Notable instruments

Tokai Telecaster
Ibanez RGD(25½ scale)Custom 
Ibanez RGD(26½ scale)Prototype 
Ibanez JEM
Ibanez PGM301
Jackson DR3 with EMG
Daemoness 'Forest' Cimmerian VI
Solar Guitars Type S (modded with EMG pickups)
Mesa Boogie Mark V
Mesa Boogie Triaxis Pre Amplifiers
Peavey 5150
Fractal Audio Axe-FX II

Jari Mäenpää no longer performs guitar live, on Facebook he released the following statement, "After thinking about it for a long time I have made the decision to drop the live guitar, which means that I will solely become 100% live vocalist."

Discography

References

External links
Wintersun official website
Ensiferum official website

1977 births
Living people
Finnish heavy metal musicians
Finnish heavy metal singers
21st-century Finnish singers
Ensiferum members
Wintersun members
Arthemesia members